The 2021 Belgrade Challenger was a professional tennis tournament played on clay courts. It was the ninth edition of the tournament which was part of the 2021 ATP Challenger Tour. It took place in Belgrade, Serbia between 12 and 18 April 2021.

For the first time, a women's tournament was also held between 26 and 31 July, categorized as a WTA 125 event at the same venue, which was part of 2021 WTA 125K series.

ATP singles main-draw entrants

Seeds

 1 Rankings are as of 5 April 2021.

Other entrants
The following players received wildcards into the singles main draw:
  Peđa Krstin
  Hamad Međedović
  Marko Miladinović

The following players received entry into the singles main draw as special exempts:
  Gonçalo Oliveira
  Blaž Rola

The following players received entry from the qualifying draw:
  Matthias Bachinger
  Elliot Benchetrit
  Alessandro Giannessi
  Marco Trungelliti

WTA singles main-draw entrants

Seeds

 1 Rankings are as of 19 July 2021.

Other entrants
The following players received wildcards into the singles main draw:
  Tena Lukas 
  Lola Radivojević
  Iva Šepa 
  Draginja Vuković

The following players received entry from the qualifying draw:
  Jessika Ponchet
  Camilla Rosatello
  Tara Würth
  Ekaterina Yashina

Withdrawals
Before the tournament
  Ana Bogdan → replaced by  Tereza Mrdeža
  Elisabetta Cocciaretto → replaced by  Lesia Tsurenko
  Zarina Diyas → replaced by  Olga Govortsova
  Océane Dodin → replaced by  Amandine Hesse
  Sara Errani → replaced by  Jaqueline Cristian
  Viktorija Golubic → replaced by  Rebecca Šramková
  Polona Hercog → replaced by  Jule Niemeier
  Anna Kalinskaya → replaced by  Andrea Petkovic
  Jasmine Paolini → replaced by  Jana Fett
  Elena-Gabriela Ruse → replaced by  Panna Udvardy
  Aliaksandra Sasnovich → replaced by  Isabella Shinikova
  Patricia Maria Țig → replaced by  Susan Bandecchi
  Stefanie Vögele → replaced by  Olga Danilović

WTA doubles main-draw entrants

Seeds

1 Rankings are as of 19 July 2021.

Other entrants
The following pair received a wildcard into the doubles main draw:
  Elena Milovanović /  Lola Radivojević

Champions

Men's singles

  Roberto Carballés Baena def.  Damir Džumhur 6–4, 7–5.

Women's singles

  Anna Karolína Schmiedlová def.  Arantxa Rus 6–3, 6–3

Men's doubles

 Guillermo Durán /  Andrés Molteni def.  Tomislav Brkić /  Nikola Ćaćić 6–4, 6–4.

Women's doubles

  Olga Govortsova /  Lidziya Marozava def.  Alena Fomina /  Ekaterina Yashina 6–2, 6–2

References

2021 ATP Challenger Tour
2021 WTA 125 tournaments
2021 in Serbian sport
April 2021 sports events in Serbia
July 2021 sports events in Serbia
GEMAX Open